K band may refer to:
 K band (IEEE), a radio frequency band from 18 to 27 GHz
 K band (infrared), an atmospheric transmission window centred on 2.2 μm
 K band (NATO), a radio frequency band from 20 to 40 GHz

See also 
 , a radio frequency band from 26.5 to 40 GHz
 , a radio frequency band from 12 to 18 GHz